The Arc de Triomphe de l'Étoile is one of the most famous monuments in Paris, France, standing at the western end of the Champs-Élysées at the centre of Place Charles de Gaulle, formerly named Place de l'Étoile—the étoile or "star" of the juncture formed by its twelve radiating avenues. The location of the arc and the plaza is shared between three arrondissements, 16th (south and west), 17th (north), and 8th (east). The Arc de Triomphe honours those who fought and died for France in the French Revolutionary and Napoleonic Wars, with the names of all French victories and generals inscribed on its inner and outer surfaces. Beneath its vault lies the Tomb of the Unknown Soldier from World War I.

The central cohesive element of the Axe historique (historic axis, a sequence of monuments and grand thoroughfares on a route running from the courtyard of the Louvre to the Grande Arche de la Défense), the Arc de Triomphe was designed by Jean Chalgrin in 1806; its iconographic programme pits heroically nude French youths against bearded Germanic warriors in chain mail. It set the tone for public monuments with triumphant patriotic messages. Three weeks after the Paris victory parade in 1919 (marking the end of hostilities in World War I), Charles Godefroy flew his Nieuport biplane under the arch's primary vault, with the event captured on newsreel.

The Grande Arche in La Défense near Paris is 110 metres high. Although it is not named an Arc de Triomphe, it has been designed on the same model and from the perspective of the Arc de Triomphe. It qualifies as the world's tallest arch.

History

Construction and late 19th century

The Arc de Triomphe is located on the right bank of the Seine at the centre of a dodecagonal configuration of twelve radiating avenues. It was commissioned in 1806, after the victory at Austerlitz by Emperor Napoleon at the peak of his fortunes. Laying the foundations alone took two years and, in 1810, when Napoleon entered Paris from the west with his new bride, Archduchess Marie-Louise of Austria, he had a wooden mock-up of the completed arch constructed. The architect, Jean Chalgrin, died in 1811 and the work was taken over by Jean-Nicolas Huyot.

During the Bourbon Restoration, construction was halted, and it would not be completed until the reign of King Louis-Philippe, between 1833 and 1836, by the architects Goust, then Huyot, under the direction of Héricart de Thury. The final cost was reported at about 10,000,000 francs (equivalent to an estimated €65 million or $75 million in 2020).

On 15 December 1840, brought back to France from Saint Helena, Napoleon's remains passed under it on their way to the Emperor's final resting place at Les Invalides. Before burial in the Panthéon, the body of Victor Hugo was displayed under the Arc on the night of 22 May 1885.

20th century

The sword carried by the Republic in the Marseillaise relief broke off on the day, it is said, that the Battle of Verdun began in 1916. The relief was immediately hidden by tarpaulins to conceal the accident and avoid any undesired ominous interpretations. On 7 August 1919, Charles Godefroy successfully flew his biplane under the Arc. Jean Navarre was the pilot who was tasked to make the flight, but he died on 10 July 1919 when he crashed near Villacoublay while training for the flight.

Following its construction, the Arc de Triomphe became the rallying point of French troops parading after successful military campaigns and for the annual Bastille Day military parade. Famous victory marches around or under the Arc have included the Germans in 1871, the French in 1919, the Germans in 1940, and the French and Allies in 1944 and 1945. A United States postage stamp of 1945 shows the Arc de Triomphe in the background as victorious American troops march down the Champs-Élysées and U.S. airplanes fly overhead on 29 August 1944. After the interment of the Unknown Soldier, however, all military parades (including the aforementioned post-1919) have avoided marching through the actual arch. The route taken is up to the arch and then around its side, out of respect for the tomb and its symbolism. Both Hitler in 1940 and de Gaulle in 1944 observed this custom.

By the early 1960s, the monument had grown very blackened from coal soot and automobile exhaust, and during 1965–1966 it was cleaned through bleaching. In the prolongation of the Avenue des Champs-Élysées, a new arch, the Grande Arche de la Défense, was built in 1982, completing the line of monuments that forms Paris's Axe historique. After the Arc de Triomphe du Carrousel and the Arc de Triomphe de l'Étoile, the Grande Arche is the third arch built on the same perspective.

In 1995, the Armed Islamic Group of Algeria placed a bomb near the Arc de Triomphe which wounded 17 people as part of a campaign of bombings.

21st century
In late 2018, the Arc de Triomphe suffered acts of vandalism as part of the Yellow vests protests. The vandals sprayed the monument with graffiti and ransacked its small museum.

L'Arc de Triomphe, Wrapped

In September 2021, the arc was wrapped in a silvery blue fabric and red rope, a posthumous project planned by artists Christo and Jeanne-Claude since the early 1960s.

Design

Monument 

The astylar design is by Jean Chalgrin (1739–1811), in the Neoclassical version of ancient Roman architecture. Major academic sculptors of France are represented in the sculpture of the Arc de Triomphe: Jean-Pierre Cortot; François Rude; Antoine Étex; James Pradier and Philippe Joseph Henri Lemaire. The main sculptures are not integral friezes but are treated as independent trophies applied to the vast ashlar masonry masses, not unlike the gilt-bronze appliqués on Empire furniture. The four sculptural groups at the base of the Arc are The Triumph of 1810 (Cortot), Resistance and Peace (both by Antoine Étex), and the most renowned of them all, Departure of the Volunteers of 1792 commonly called La Marseillaise (François Rude). The face of the allegorical representation of France calling forth her people on this last was used as the belt buckle for the honorary rank of Marshal of France. Since the fall of Napoleon (1815), the sculpture representing Peace is interpreted as commemorating the Peace of 1815.

In the attic above the richly sculptured frieze of soldiers are 30 shields engraved with the names of major French victories in the French Revolution and Napoleonic wars. The inside walls of the monument list the names of 660 people, among which are 558 French generals of the First French Empire; The names of those generals killed in battle are underlined. Also inscribed, on the shorter sides of the four supporting columns, are the names of the major French victories in the Napoleonic Wars. The battles that took place in the period between the departure of Napoleon from Elba to his final defeat at Waterloo are not included.

For four years from 1882 to 1886, a monumental sculpture by Alexandre Falguière topped the arch. Titled Le triomphe de la Révolution ("The Triumph of the Revolution"), it depicted a chariot drawn by horses preparing "to crush Anarchy and Despotism".

Inside the monument, a permanent exhibition, conceived by artist Maurice Benayoun and architect Christophe Girault, opened in February 2007.

Tomb of the Unknown Soldier

Beneath the Arc is the Tomb of the Unknown Soldier from World War I. Interred on Armistice Day 1920, an eternal flame burns in memory of the dead who were never identified (now in both world wars).

A ceremony is held at the Tomb of the Unknown Soldier every 11 November on the anniversary of the Armistice of 11 November 1918 signed by the Entente Powers and Germany in 1918. It was originally decided on 12 November 1919 to bury the unknown soldier's remains in the Panthéon, but a public letter-writing campaign led to the decision to bury him beneath the Arc de Triomphe. The coffin was put in the chapel on the first floor of the Arc on 10 November 1920, and put in its final resting place on 28 January 1921. The slab on top bears the inscription: Ici repose un soldat français mort pour la Patrie, 1914–1918 ("Here rests a French soldier who died for the Fatherland, 1914–1918").

In 1961, U.S. President John F. Kennedy and First Lady Jacqueline Kennedy paid their respects at the Tomb of the Unknown Soldier, accompanied by President Charles de Gaulle. After the 1963 assassination of President Kennedy, Mrs. Kennedy remembered the eternal flame at the Arc de Triomphe and requested that an eternal flame be placed next to her husband's grave at Arlington National Cemetery in Virginia.

Details
 The four main sculptural groups on each of the Arc's pillars are:
 Le Départ de 1792 (or La Marseillaise), by François Rude. The sculptural group celebrates the cause of the French First Republic during the 10 August uprising. Above the volunteers is the winged personification of Liberty. This group served as a recruitment tool in the early months of World War I and encouraged the French to invest in war loans in 1915–1916.
 Le Triomphe de 1810, by Jean-Pierre Cortot celebrates the Treaty of Schönbrunn. This group features Napoleon, crowned by the goddess of Victory.
 La Résistance de 1814, by Antoine Étex commemorates the French Resistance to the Allied Armies during the War of the Sixth Coalition.
 La Paix de 1815, by Antoine Étex commemorates the Treaty of Paris, concluded in that year.

 Six reliefs sculpted on the façades of the Arch, representing important moments of the French Revolution and of the Napoleonic era include:
 Les funérailles du général Marceau (General Marceau's burial), by Henri Lemaire (Southern façade, right).
 La bataille d'Aboukir (The Battle of Aboukir), by Bernard Seurre (Southern façade, left).
 La bataille de Jemappes (The Battle of Jemappes), by Carlo Marochetti (Eastern façade).
 Le passage du pont d'Arcole (The Battle of Arcole), by Jean-Jacques Feuchère (Northern façade, right).
 La prise d'Alexandrie (The Fall of Alexandria), by John-Étienne Chaponnière (Northern façade, left).
 La bataille d'Austerlitz (The Battle of Austerlitz), by Théodore Gechter (Western façade).

 The names of 158 battles fought by the French First Republic and the First French Empire are engraved on the monument. Among them, 30 battles are engraved on the attic:

 96 battles are engraved on the inner façades, under the great arches:

 The names of 660 military leaders who served during the French First Republic and the First French Empire are engraved on the inner façades of the small arches. Underlined names signify those who died on the battlefield:

 The great arcades are decorated with allegorical figures representing characters in Roman mythology (by James Pradier):

 The ceiling with 21 sculpted roses:

 Interior of the Arc de Triomphe:

 There are several plaques at the foot of the monument:

Access
The Arc de Triomphe is accessible by the RER and Métro, with exit at the Charles de Gaulle–Étoile station. Because of heavy traffic on the roundabout of which the Arc is the centre, it is recommended that pedestrians use one of two underpasses located at the Champs Élysées and the Avenue de la Grande Armée. A lift will take visitors almost to the top – to the attic, where a small museum contains large models of the Arc and tells its story from the time of its construction. Another 40 steps remain to climb to reach the top, the terrasse, from where one can enjoy a panoramic view of Paris.

The location of the arc, as well as the Place de l'Étoile, is shared between three arrondissements, 16th (south and west), 17th (north), and 8th (east).

See also

 Names inscribed under the Arc de Triomphe
 Battles inscribed on the Arc de Triomphe
 List of works by James Pradier
 Napoleon's tomb
 Galerie des Batailles
 Bastille Day military parade
 Romanian Arcul de Triumf
 Simpang Lima Gumul Monument

References

External links

 Inscriptions on the Arc de Triomphe
 Clarification of history of Arc de Triomphe
 The permanent exhibition inside the Arc de Triomphe
 View from the Arc de Triomphe

 
Cultural infrastructure completed in 1836
Monuments and memorials in Paris
Neoclassical architecture in Paris
Triumphal arches in France
Buildings and structures in the 8th arrondissement of Paris
Buildings and structures in the 16th arrondissement of Paris
Buildings and structures in the 17th arrondissement of Paris
Landmarks in France
Champs-Élysées
Terminating vistas in Paris
Monuments of the Centre des monuments nationaux